Melissa Ellen Gilbert (born May 8, 1964) is an American actress, television director, producer, politician, and former president of the Screen Actors Guild.

Gilbert began her career as a child actress in the late 1960s, appearing in numerous commercials and guest starring roles on television. From 1974 to 1983, she starred as Laura Ingalls Wilder, the second oldest daughter of Charles Ingalls (played by Michael Landon) on the NBC series Little House on the Prairie. During the run of Little House, Gilbert appeared in several television films, including The Diary of Anne Frank and The Miracle Worker.

As an adult, she continued her career mainly in television films. Gilbert has also continued with guest starring roles on television and has done voice work for animation such as Batman: The Animated Series as Barbara Gordon / Batgirl. From 2009 to 2010, Gilbert appeared as Caroline "Ma" Ingalls in the touring production of Little House on the Prairie, the Musical. In 2012, she was a contestant on season fourteen of the popular reality dance competition show Dancing with the Stars on ABC.

Gilbert served as the President of the Screen Actors Guild from 2001 to 2005. In 2009, her autobiography Prairie Tale: A Memoir, was released. In 2014, she wrote a short story for children, called Daisy and Josephine as well as My Prairie Cookbook: Memories and Frontier Food from My Little House to Yours.

In 2016, Gilbert ran for U.S. Congress as a Democrat in Michigan's 8th congressional district and she won the Democratic primary. She later dropped out because of health issues stemming from a 2012 accident.

Early life and family
Gilbert was born in Los Angeles, California, on May 8, 1964, to a newly engaged couple, Kathy Wood and David Darlington, and given up for adoption immediately after birth. She was adopted one day later by actor and comedian Paul Gilbert and his wife, dancer and actress Barbara Crane, the daughter of The Honeymooners creator Harry Crane. They later adopted a son, Jonathan, who co-starred on Little House on the Prairie. 

Gilbert's parents divorced when she was 8 years old. Her mother then married attorney Harold Abeles, and together they had biological daughter Sara Rebecca Abeles (the actress known professionally as Sara Gilbert) on January 29, 1975. 

On February 13, 1976, Paul Gilbert died. Although 11-year-old Melissa was told that he had suffered a stroke, she found out years later that he had been a VA patient who dealt with constant pain and that he had taken his own life. The marriage of Barbara and Harold Abeles later ended in divorce. According to her biography, Gilbert was raised in her adoptive mother's Jewish religion, but did not have any formal religious education or conversion ceremony.

Career

Early years

Gilbert's earliest television appearances were in dozens of commercials, including one for Alpo dog food with Lorne Greene (Michael Landon's television father on Bonanza). She also attended school with Landon's daughter, Leslie Landon. It was Leslie who informed her that she had won the role of Laura Ingalls on Little House on the Prairie, beating out over 500 child actresses for the part. The pilot was shot in 1973 and was a ratings success. Almost a year later, Gilbert began filming the series. Gilbert became extremely close to the Landon family after her adoptive father died. However, a rift developed between Michael Landon and Gilbert after the revelation of Landon's affair with Little House young makeup artist, Cindy Clerico.

Gilbert had limited contact with Landon after Little House ended during the 1983–84 season. Seven years later, she was contacted by Landon's family and upon news of his condition, paid him a heartfelt visit following his May 9, 1991, appearance on The Tonight Show Starring Johnny Carson where he discussed his pancreatic cancer. She visited Landon at his Malibu home where he was, by then, bedridden, and they spent the afternoon together. Landon died one week later. When Gilbert gave birth to her son with second husband Bruce Boxleitner on October 6, 1995, they named him Michael, in honor of Landon.

Career after Little House

Gilbert has continued to work regularly, mainly in television. She starred as Jean Donovan in the biopic Choices of the Heart (1983), and as Anna Sheridan in three episodes of Babylon 5 with then-husband Boxleitner in 1996. She also provided the voice of Batgirl on the 1990s Batman: The Animated Series, though she would be replaced by voice actress Tara Strong for the series' follow-up The New Batman Adventures.

For her contribution to the television industry, Gilbert received a star on the Hollywood Walk of Fame at 6429 Hollywood Blvd in 1985. Her then-fiancé, Rob Lowe, was present with her when her star was unveiled during the ceremony.

In 1998, she was inducted into the Western Performers Hall of Fame at the National Cowboy & Western Heritage Museum in Oklahoma City, Oklahoma. In 2006, Gilbert appeared as Shari Noble, a patient looking to reconstruct her nipples after committing zoophilia with her dog in a season four episode of Nip/Tuck.

In 2008 and through 2009, Gilbert played Caroline "Ma" Ingalls in the musical adaptation of Little House on the Prairie. This world premiere production at the Guthrie Theater in Minneapolis was directed by Francesca Zambello and also starred Kara Lindsay as Laura. The show ran through October 19 and was on a US National tour for 2009–10. The tour ended in June 2010 at Starlight Theatre in Kansas City, Missouri.

In March and April 2018, Gilbert starred in an Off-Off-Broadway, limited-run production of Geraldine Aron's 2001 one-woman play 2001 My Brilliant Divorce.

Dancing with the Stars

In March 2012, Gilbert joined the cast of celebrity contestants on season 14 of Dancing with the Stars. She was paired with Maksim Chmerkovskiy. During week four's show, while dancing the Paso Doble, she fell and hit her head on Maksim's leg and suffered a mild concussion and was taken to a hospital. She went home to recuperate, but returned to continue in the competition. In week eight of competition, she was eliminated, finishing in fifth place.

Screen Actors Guild presidency
Gilbert was elected president of the Screen Actors Guild in 2001 after a contentious candidacy, in which she ultimately beat her opponent, Rhoda actress Valerie Harper, 21,351 votes to 12,613 votes after a second vote was taken. In 2003, she was re-elected, defeating Kent McCord with 50% of the vote to his 42%. In July 2005, she announced that she would not seek a third term. She was succeeded by Alan Rosenberg, who assumed the guild presidency on September 25.

2016 congressional campaign
On August 10, 2015, Gilbert announced her campaign for Michigan's 8th congressional district in the 2016 elections to the United States House of Representatives. Gilbert, who was the presumptive Democratic nominee in the district, dropped out of the race in May 2016, citing health issues.

Personal life

Relationships
After her relationship with Rob Lowe ended, Gilbert left for New York City to star in the play A Shayna Maidel. Gilbert was set up with actor Bo Brinkman, a cousin of actors Randy Quaid and Dennis Quaid. The couple married on February 22, 1988, seven weeks after her split from Lowe. Their son was born on May 1, 1989. The couple divorced in 1992.

Weeks after Gilbert's divorce filing, actor Bruce Boxleitner's former wife set him up with Gilbert. Gilbert had met Boxleitner as a teenager when they both were on Battle of the Network Stars; he was her teenage crush. After reconnecting, they dated on and off for over a year. They were engaged twice and both engagements were ended by Boxleitner. After reuniting for a third time, they married on January 1, 1995, in her mother's living room. Gilbert gave birth to their son , on October 6, 1995. Gilbert was stepmother to Boxleitner's two sons. On March 1, 2011, Gilbert announced that she and Boxleitner had separated. On August 22, 2011, Gilbert filed for divorce from Boxleitner.

In January 2013, Gilbert's representative confirmed her engagement to actor Timothy Busfield. They married on April 24, 2013, lived in Howell, Michigan, from 2013 to 2018, and moved to New York City late in 2018.  Also in 2018, the couple purchased a cottage in the Catskill Mountains of Upstate New York.  Gilbert and Busfield have been renovating the cottage and intend to live there permanently.

Tax issues
Following her announcement as a candidate for U.S. Representative from Michigan, a spokesperson for her opponent's campaign referred to Gilbert as a "tax cheat". Gilbert owed $360,000 in back federal taxes and $112,000 in California state taxes. Gilbert has stated the tax debt is an outgrowth of a stalled acting career, the economy, and divorce. She has negotiated a repayment plan with the IRS.

Health issues
Gilbert has battled alcoholism and drug abuse, which she wrote about in her 2009 autobiography.

While playing the role of Caroline "Ma" Ingalls in the touring musical Little House on the Prairie, a visit to the doctor revealed that Gilbert had been working with a broken back for months. On July 22, 2010, Gilbert underwent surgery to replace a disc as well as fuse a vertebra in her lower spine. The surgery was described as a complete success.

In January 2015, Gilbert decided to have her breast implants removed for health reasons.

Filmography

Film

Television

Awards and nominations

References

Sources

External links

About Melissa Gilbert

1964 births
Living people
20th-century American actresses
21st-century American actresses
Actresses from Los Angeles
American actor-politicians
American adoptees
American child actresses
American film actresses
American trade union leaders
American memoirists
American musical theatre actresses
American stage actresses
American television actresses
American television directors
American voice actresses
American women television directors
Jewish American actresses
Participants in American reality television series
Presidents of the Screen Actors Guild
Michigan Democrats
Women in Michigan politics
Activists from California
American women memoirists
21st-century American Jews